This is a list of foreign ministers in 2001.

Africa
 Algeria - Abdelaziz Belkhadem (2000-2005)
 Angola - João Bernardo de Miranda (1999-2008)
 Benin - Antoine Idji Kolawolé (1998-2003)
 Botswana - Mompati Merafhe (1994-2008)
 Burkina Faso - Youssouf Ouedraogo (1999-2007)
 Burundi -
 Severin Ntahomvukiye (1998-2001)
 Thérence Sinunguruza (2001-2005)
 Cameroon -
 Augustin Kontchou Kouomegni (1997-2001)
 François Xavier Ngoubeyou (2001-2004)
 Cape Verde -
 Rui Alberto de Figueiredo Soares (2000-2001)
 Manuel Inocêncio Sousa (2001-2002)
 Central African Republic -
 Marcel Metefara (1999-2001)
 Agba Otikpo Mézodé (2001-2003)
 Chad - Mahamat Saleh Annadif (1997-2003)
 Comoros - Mohamed El-Amine Souef (1999-2002)
 Republic of Congo - Rodolphe Adada (1997-2007)
 Democratic Republic of Congo -  Léonard She Okitundu (2000-2003)
 Côte d'Ivoire -  Abou Drahamane Sangare (2000-2003)
 Djibouti - Ali Abdi Farah (1999-2005)
 Egypt -
 Amr Moussa (1991-2001)
 Ahmed Maher (2001-2004)
 Equatorial Guinea - Santiago Nsobeya Efuman (1999-2003)
 Eritrea - Ali Said Abdella (2000-2005)
 Ethiopia - Seyoum Mesfin (1991-2010)
 Gabon - Jean Ping (1999-2008)
 The Gambia -
 Momodou Lamin Sedat Jobe (1998-2001)
 Baboucarr-Blaise Jagne (2001-2004)
 Ghana - 
 James Victor Gbeho (1997-2001)
 Hackman Owusu-Agyeman (2001-2003)
 Guinea - Mahawa Bangoura (2000-2002)
 Guinea-Bissau -
 Yaya Diallo (2000-2001)
 Faustino Imbali (2001)
 Antonieta Rosa Gomes (2001)
 Malam Mané (2001)
 Filomena Mascarenhas Tipote (2001-2002)
 Kenya -
 Bonaya Godana (1998-2001)
 Christopher Obure (2001)
 Marsden Madoka (2001-2003)
 Lesotho - Tom Thabane (1998-2002)
 Liberia - Monie Captan (1996-2003)
 Libya - Abdel Rahman Shalgham (2000-2009)
 Madagascar - Lila Ratsifandrihamanana (1998-2002)
 Malawi - Lilian Patel (2000-2004)
 Mali - Modibo Sidibe (1997-2002)
 Mauritania -
 Ahmed Ould Sid'Ahmed (1998-2001)
 Dah Ould Abdi (2001-2002)
 Mauritius - Anil Gayan (2000-2003)
 Morocco - Mohamed Benaissa (1999-2007)
 Western Sahara - Mohamed Salem Ould Salek (1998–2023)
 Mozambique - Leonardo Simão (1994-2005)
 Namibia - Theo-Ben Gurirab (1990-2002)
 Niger -
 Nassirou Sabo (2000-2001)
 Aïchatou Mindaoudou (2001-2010)
 Nigeria - Sule Lamido (2000-2003)
 Rwanda - André Bumaya (2000-2002)
 São Tomé and Príncipe -
 Joaquim Rafael Branco (2000-2001)
 Patrice Trovoada (2001-2002)
 Senegal - Cheikh Tidiane Gadio (2000-2009)
 Seychelles - Jérémie Bonnelame (1997-2005)
 Sierra Leone -
 Sama Banya (1998-2001)
 Ahmed Ramadan Dumbuya (2001-2002)
 Somalia - Ismail Mahmud Hurre (2000-2002)
 Somaliland -
 Mahmud Salah Nur (1997-2001)
 Abdihamid Garad Jama (2001-2002)
 South Africa - Nkosazana Dlamini-Zuma (1999-2009)
 Sudan - Mustafa Osman Ismail (1998-2005)
 Swaziland -
 Albert Nhlanhla Shabangu (1998-2001)
 Abednego Ntshangase (2001-2003)
 Tanzania - Jakaya Kikwete (1995-2006)
 Togo - Joseph Kokou Koffigoh (2000-2002)
 Tunisia - Habib Ben Yahia (1999-2004)
 Uganda -
 Eriya Kategaya (1996-2001)
 James Wapakhabulo (2001-2004)
 Zambia - Keli Walubita (1997-2002)
 Zimbabwe - Stan Mudenge (1995-2005)

Asia
 Afghanistan -
 Wakil Ahmed Muttawakil (1999-2001)
 Abdullah Abdullah (2001-2006)
 Armenia - Vartan Oskanian (1998-2008)
 Azerbaijan - Vilayat Guliyev (1999-2004)
 Nagorno-Karabakh - Naira Melkumyan (1997-2002)
 Bahrain - Sheikh Muhammad ibn Mubarak ibn Hamad Al Khalifah (1971-2005)
 Bangladesh -
 Abdus Samad Azad (1996-2001)
 Latifur Rahman (2001)
 A.Q.M. Badruddoza Chowdhury (2001)
 Morshed Khan (2001-2006)
 Bhutan - Jigme Thinley (1998-2003)
 Brunei - Pengiran Muda Mohamed Bolkiah (1984–2015)
 Cambodia - Hor Namhong (1998–2016)
 China - Tang Jiaxuan (1998-2003)
 East Timor - José Ramos-Horta (2000-2006)
 Georgia - Irakli Menagarishvili (1995-2003)
 Abkhazia - Sergei Shamba (1997-2004)
 South Ossetia - Murat Dzhioyev (1998-2012)
 India - Jaswant Singh (1998-2002)
 Indonesia -
 Alwi Shihab (1999-2001)
 Hassan Wirajuda (2001-2009)
 Iran - Kamal Kharazi (1997-2005)
 Iraq -
 Muhammad Saeed al-Sahhaf (1992-2001)
 Tariq Aziz (acting) (2001)
 Naji Sabri (2001-2003)
 Israel -
 Shlomo Ben-Ami (2000-2001)
 Shimon Peres (2001-2002)
 Japan -
 Yōhei Kōno (1999-2001)
 Makiko Tanaka (2001-2002)
 Jordan - Abdul Ilah Khatib (1998-2002)
 Kazakhstan - Erlan Idrisov (1999-2002)
 North Korea - Paek Nam-sun (1998-2007)
 South Korea -
 Yi Jeong-bin (2000-2001)
 Han Seung-soo (2001-2002)
 Kuwait - Sheikh Sabah Al-Ahmad Al-Jaber Al-Sabah (1978-2003)
 Kyrgyzstan - Muratbek Imanaliyev (1997-2002)
 Laos - Somsavat Lengsavad (1993-2006)
 Lebanon - Mahmoud Hammoud (2000-2003)
 Malaysia - Syed Hamid Albar (1999-2008)
 Maldives - Fathulla Jameel (1978-2005)
 Mongolia - Luvsangiin Erdenechuluun (2000-2004)
 Myanmar - Win Aung (1998-2004)
 Nepal -
 Chakra Bastola (2000-2001)
 Sher Bahadur Deuba (2001-2002)
 Oman - Yusuf bin Alawi bin Abdullah (1982–2020)
 Pakistan - Abdul Sattar (1999-2002)
 Philippines -
 Domingo Siazon, Jr. (1995-2001)
 Teofisto Guingona, Jr. (2001-2002)
 Qatar - Sheikh Hamad bin Jassim bin Jaber Al Thani (1992-2013)
 Saudi Arabia - Prince Saud bin Faisal bin Abdulaziz Al Saud (1975–2015)
 Singapore - S. Jayakumar (1994-2004)
 Sri Lanka -
 Lakshman Kadirgamar (1994-2001)
 Tyronne Fernando (2001-2004)
 Syria - Farouk al-Sharaa (1984-2006)
 Taiwan - Tien Hung-mao (2000-2002)
 Tajikistan - Talbak Nazarov (1994-2006)
 Thailand -
 Surin Pitsuwan (1997-2001)
 Surakiart Sathirathai (2001-2005)
 Turkey - İsmail Cem (1997-2002)
 Turkmenistan -
 Batyr Berdiýew (2000-2001)
 Raşit Meredow (2001–present)
 United Arab Emirates - Rashid Abdullah Al Nuaimi (1980-2006)
 Uzbekistan - Abdulaziz Komilov (1994-2003)
 Vietnam - Nguyễn Dy Niên (2000-2006)
 Yemen -
 Abdul Qadir Bajamal (1998-2001)
 Abu Bakr al-Qirbi (2001-2014)

Australia and Oceania
 Australia - Alexander Downer (1996-2007)
 Fiji - Kaliopate Tavola (2000-2006)
 French Polynesia - Gaston Flosse (2000-2004)
 Kiribati -  Teburoro Tito (1994-2003)
 Marshall Islands -
 Alvin Jacklick (2000-2001)
 Gerald Zackios (2001-2008)
 Micronesia - Ieske K. Iehsi (2000-2003)
 Nauru -
 Bernard Dowiyogo (2000-2001)
 René Harris (2001-2003)
 New Zealand - Phil Goff (1999-2005)
 Cook Islands - Robert Woonton (1999-2004)
 Niue - Sani Lakatani (1999-2002)
 Palau - Temmy Shmull (2001-2009)
 Papua New Guinea -
 Bart Philemon (2000-2001)
 John Pundari (2001)
 John Waiko (2001-2002)
 Samoa - Tuilaepa Sailele Malielegaoi (1998–2021)
 Solomon Islands -
 Danny Philip (2000-2001)
 David Sitai (2001)
 Alex Bartlett (2001-2002)
 Tonga - Prince 'Ulukalala Lavaka Ata (1998-2004)
 Tuvalu -
 Lagitupu Tuilimu (2000-2001)
 Faimalaga Luka (2001)
 Koloa Talake (2001-2002)
 Vanuatu -
 Serge Vohor (1999-2001)
 Alain Mahe (2001-2002)

Europe
 Albania -
 Paskal Milo (1997–2001)
 Arta Dade (2001–2002)
 Andorra -
 Albert Pintat (1997–2001)
 Juli Minoves Triquell (2001–2007)
 Austria - Benita Ferrero-Waldner (2000–2004)
 Belarus - Mikhail Khvostov (2000–2003)
 Belgium - Louis Michel (1999–2004)
 Brussels-Capital Region - Guy Vanhengel (2000–2009)
 Flanders -
 Patrick Dewael (1999–2001)
 Paul Van Grembergen (2001–2002)
 Bosnia and Herzegovina -
 Jadranko Prlić (1996–2001)
 Zlatko Lagumdžija (2001–2003)
 Bulgaria -
 Nadezhda Mihailova (1997–2001)
 Solomon Passy (2001–2005)
 Croatia - Tonino Picula (2000–2003)
 Cyprus - Ioannis Kasoulidis (1997–2003)
 Northern Cyprus - Tahsin Ertuğruloğlu (1998–2004)
 Czech Republic - Jan Kavan (1998–2002)
 Denmark -
 Mogens Lykketoft (2000–2001)
 Per Stig Møller (2001–2010)
 Estonia - Toomas Hendrik Ilves (1999–2002)
 Finland - Erkki Tuomioja (2000–2007)
 France - Hubert Védrine (1997–2002)
 Germany - Joschka Fischer (1998–2005)
 Greece - George Papandreou (1999–2004)
 Hungary - János Martonyi (1998–2002)
 Iceland - Halldór Ásgrímsson (1995–2004)
 Ireland - Brian Cowen (2000–2004)
 Italy -
 Lamberto Dini (1996–2001)
 Renato Ruggiero (2001–2002)
 Latvia - Indulis Bērziņš (1999–2002)
 Liechtenstein -
 Andrea Willi (1993–2001)
 Ernst Walch (2001–2005)
 Lithuania - Antanas Valionis (2000–2006)
 Luxembourg - Lydie Polfer (1999–2004)
 Macedonia -
 Srgjan Kerim (2000–2001)
 Ilinka Mitreva (2001)
 Slobodan Čašule (2001–2002)
 Malta -  Joe Borg (1999–2004)
 Moldova -
 Nicolae Cernomaz (2000–2001)
 Iurie Leancă (acting) (2001)
 Nicolae Dudău (2001–2004)
 Transnistria - Valeriy Litskai (2000–2008)
 Netherlands - Jozias van Aartsen (1998–2002)
 Norway -
 Thorbjørn Jagland (2000–2001)
 Jan Petersen (2001–2005)
 Poland -
 Władysław Bartoszewski (2000–2001)
 Włodzimierz Cimoszewicz (2001–2005)
 Portugal - Jaime Gama (1995–2002)
 Romania - Mircea Geoană (2000–2004)
 Russia - Igor Ivanov (1998–2004)
 San Marino - Gabriele Gatti (1986–2002)
 Slovakia - Eduard Kukan (1998–2006)
 Slovenia - Dimitrij Rupel (2000–2004)
 Spain - Josep Piqué (2000–2002)
 Sweden - Anna Lindh (1998–2003)
 Switzerland - Joseph Deiss (1999–2002)
 Ukraine - Anatoliy Zlenko (2000–2003)
 United Kingdom -
 Robin Cook (1997–2001)
 Jack Straw (2001–2006)
 Scotland - Jack McConnell (2000–2001)
 Vatican City - Archbishop Jean-Louis Tauran (1990–2003)
 Yugoslavia - Goran Svilanović (2000–2004)
 Montenegro - Branko Lukovac (2000–2002)

North America and the Caribbean
 Antigua and Barbuda - Lester Bird (1991-2004)
 The Bahamas - Janet Bostwick (1994-2002)
 Barbados - Billie Miller (1994-2008)
 Belize - Said Musa (1998-2002)
 Canada - John Manley (2000-2002)
 Quebec - Louise Beaudoin (1998-2003)
 Costa Rica - Roberto Rojas López (1998-2002)
 Cuba - Felipe Pérez Roque (1999-2009)
 Dominica -
 Pierre Charles (2000-2001)
 Osborne Riviere (2001-2005)
 Dominican Republic - Hugo Tolentino Dipp (2000-2003)
 El Salvador - María Eugenia Brizuela de Ávila (1999-2004)
 Grenada - Elvin Nimrod (2000-2008)
 Guatemala - Gabriel Orellana Rojas (2000-2002)
 Haiti -
 Fritz Longchamp (1995-2001)
 Joseph Philippe Antonio (2001-2004)
 Honduras - Roberto Flores Bermúdez (1999-2002)
 Jamaica -
 Paul Robertson (2000-2001)
 Keith Desmond Knight (2001-2006)
 Mexico - Jorge Castañeda Gutman (2000-2003)
 Nicaragua - Francisco Aguirre Sacasa (2000-2002)
 Panama - José Miguel Alemán Healy (1999-2003)
 Saint Kitts and Nevis -
 Sam Condor (2000-2001)
 Timothy Harris (2001-2008)
 Saint Lucia -
 George Odlum (1997-2001)
 Julian Hunte (2001-2004)
 Puerto Rico –
Angel Morey (1999–2001)
Ferdinand Mercado (2001–2003)
 Saint Vincent and the Grenadines -
 Allan Cruickshank (1998-2001)
 Louis Straker (2001-2005)
 Trinidad and Tobago -
 Mervyn Assam (2000-2001)
 Knowlson Gift (2001-2006)
 United States -
 Madeleine Albright (1997-2001)
 Colin Powell (2001-2005)

South America
 Argentina -
 Adalberto Rodríguez Giavarini (1999-2001)
 José María Vernet (2001-2002)
 Bolivia -
 Javier Murillo de la Rocha (1997-2001)
 Gustavo Fernández Saavedra (2001-2002)
 Brazil -
 Luiz Felipe Palmeira Lampreia (1995-2001)
 Luiz Felipe de Seixas Corrêa (acting) (2001)
 Celso Lafer (2001-2003)
 Chile - Soledad Alvear (2000-2004)
 Colombia - Guillermo Fernández de Soto (1998-2002)
 Ecuador - Heinz Moeller Freile (2000-2003)
 Guyana -
 Clement Rohee (1992-2001)
 Rudy Insanally (2001-2008)
 Paraguay -
 Juan Esteban Aguirre Martínez (2000-2001)
 José Antonio Moreno Ruffinelli (2001-2003)
 Peru -
 Javier Pérez de Cuéllar (2000-2001)
 Diego García Sayán (2001-2002)
 Suriname - Marie Levens (2000-2005)
 Uruguay - Didier Opertti (1998-2005)
 Venezuela -
 José Vicente Rangel (1999-2001)
 Luis Alfonso Dávila (2001-2002)

2001 in international relations
Foreign ministers
2001